George Fleming Moore (July 17, 1822 – August 30, 1883) was a justice of the Supreme Court of Texas from October 1862 to June 1866, chief justice, August 1866 to September 1867, a justice again from February 1874 to April 1876, and chief justice again from November 1878 to November 1881.

References

Justices of the Texas Supreme Court
1822 births
1883 deaths
19th-century American judges